Çeteci Abdullah Pasha ibn Ibrahim al-Husayni al-Jarmaki (also known as Abdullah Pasha al-Jatahji) was an Ottoman statesman. He served terms as the governor of Sivas, Diyarbekir, Rakka, Adana, Van, Erzurum, Kütahya, Aleppo and Damascus. Çeteci was born in 1703 in the village of Çermik (also spelled Jarmak), hence his surname "al-Jarmaki".

Prior to his political career, Çeteci was a "distinguished field commander" according to Alexis de Tocqueville. He fought in the Ottoman campaigns in the Caucasus in the 1720s and in the war against the Safavid Empire. During those campaigns he served as a levend başağasi (commander of a mercenary battalion). He was promoted to beylerbey of Sivas in 1739. He founded the Çeteci Abdullah Pasha Medresesi, an Islamic school in his hometown of Çermik in 1756-57.

Governor of Damascus
Çeteci entered office in January 1758 after his predecessor Husayn Pasha ibn Makki failed to protect the Hajj caravan from a massive Bedouin raid. His first major action was suppressing a revolt by the Janissaries who had staged a revolt during Husayn Pasha's tenure. The revolt in the Midan district was put down, but Çeteci's troops engaged in mass killings and looting against rebellious neighborhoods. Several men, women and children were killed.

The economy in Damascus, already flailing, was severely damaged during the revolt's suppression since Midan was a major bread market for the city. Its bakeries closed as a result of the violence. The events in Midan coincided with bad grain harvest elsewhere in the province, resulting in the depletion of bread in bakeries throughout the city. According to a Damascene chronicler at the time, the empty bakeries were surrounded by "great crowds of men, women and children, from whom heart-breaking cries and wails were heard". Çeteci, wary of a repeat of the bread riots of 1757, dispatched troops to guard the bakeries.

Çeteci replaced the naqib al-ashraf (politically privileged descendant of Muhammad) Sayyid Hamza with his rival Ali al-Ajlani. Hamza was exiled to Cyprus on Çeteci's orders and Ajlani remained in the post until his death in 1778. Çeteci was reappointed as governor of Diyarbaker in January 1760. He was succeeded as governor of Damascus by Muhammad Pasha al-Shalik, who served for a few months before being replaced by Uthman Pasha al-Kurji. Çeteci died later in 1760.

References

Bibliography

1703 births
1760 deaths
18th-century people from the Ottoman Empire
Military personnel of the Ottoman Empire
Ottoman governors of Damascus
Political people from the Ottoman Empire
People from Çermik
Ottoman governors of Aleppo